This article details the Widnes Vikings rugby league football club's 2016 season. This is the Vikings 5th consecutive season back in the Super League.

Table

To be inserted.

2016 fixtures and results

2016 Super League Fixtures

2016 Super 8's

2016 Challenge Cup

Player appearances
Super League Only

 = Injured

 = Suspended

Challenge Cup

Player appearances
Challenge Cup Games only

2016 squad statistics

 Appearances and points include (Super League, Challenge Cup and Play-offs) as of 22 April 2016.

 = Injured
 = Suspended

2016 transfers in/out

In

Out

References

External links
Widnes Vikings Website
Widnes Vikings - SL Website

Widnes Vikings seasons
Super League XXI by club